Belgique is an unincorporated community in eastern Perry County, Missouri, United States. It is located approximately five miles south of Chester, Illinois in Perry County's Bois Brule Township.

Etymology
Since a town already existed in Missouri which bore the name of Belgium, the Flemish residents opted to use the French name for their homeland.

History
The town was originally settled by Catholic Flemings from Belgium. A Catholic church, The Nativity of the Blessed Virgin Mary, existed in Belgique from 1884 to 1992.  A post office was established in 1890, but as the name "Belgium" had already been taken, the French name for Belgium "Belgique" was used instead.  Its post office has closed and its mail now comes from Perryville.  Since the flood of 1993 there is no longer an existing town.

Floods
Of the many floods over the centuries, the most devastating flood was the Great Flood of 1993.  The subsequent flood destroyed the village, leaving only a handful of residents to return to the area following the flood.

Geography
Belgique was located on the flat alluvial plain of the Bois Brule Bottom situated in the northern part of Perry County.

Gallery

See also
 Perry County, Missouri

References 

Belgian-American history
Flemish American
Unincorporated communities in Perry County, Missouri
Unincorporated communities in Missouri